The 2015 Tennessee State Tigers football team represented Tennessee State University as a member of the Ohio Valley Conference (OVC) in the 2015 NCAA Division I FCS football season. Led by sixth-year head coach Rod Reed, the Tigers compiled an overall record of 4–6 with a mark of 1–6 in conference play, placing eighth in the OVC. Tennessee State played home games in Nashville, Tennessee at Nissan Stadium and Hale Stadium.

The Tigers were initially ineligible to participate in postseason play for the 2015 season to due Academic Progress Rate (APR). violations, but athletic director Teresa Phillips issue an appeal was issued. The Tigers had the postseason ban lifted in early June due to miscalculation by the National Collegiate Athletic Association (NCAA) of the football program's APR based on outdated information.

Schedule

References

Tennessee State
Tennessee State Tigers football seasons
Tennessee State Tigers football